MGSCOMM is an independently owned integrated marketing communications agency.  MGSCOMM, formerly known as Machado Garcia-Serra Communications, ranked among the top 20 in the “2013 Advertising Age, 50 Largest U.S. Hispanic Agencies”, as well as named among the top 100 in the “2012  Hispanic Business 500 Largest US Hispanic-Owned Companies”. The Minority Business Enterprise is headquartered in Miami, Florida, with offices in New York City and Mexico City.

History
MGSCOMM was founded in Miami, FL by Manuel E. Machado and Al Garcia-Serra in March 2003. In 2004, the company acquired The IAC Group (1978), an advertising and public relations agency in Miami. In 2009, MGSCOMM merged with Reynardus+Moya, a full-service advertising agency in New York. In 2012, MGSCOMM joined forces with Revolucion LLC, a full-service brand-communications agency in New York. Today, MGSCOMM is a Minority Business Enterprise managed by Manuel E. Machado, CEO, Al Garcia-Serra, chairman of the board, Jorge Moya, CCO/Partner, Carla Trum Mercado, President of Advertising/Partner, Fernando Bonet, COO, Yvonne Lorie, President of SWAY PR/Partner, and Federico Mejer, managing director of MGSCOMM's New York City office/Partner. Headquartered in Miami, MGSCOMM also has offices in New York City and Mexico City.

In 2013, MGSCOMM celebrated its 10-year milestone anniversary with a Gold ADDY award from the American Advertising Federation (AAF) for its Objectivity Brand Book and HispanicAd.com's Agency Executive of the Year award for Manuel E. Machado. In addition, MGSCOMM's President of SWAY Public Relations, Yvonne Lorie, was awarded the 2013 PR Achievement PRemio Award by the Hispanic Public Relations Association (HPRA).

In 2014, MGSCOMM received a Gold ADDY for its Subjectivity Brand Book in the Self Promotion category, along with 4 other Gold ADDYs and 6 Silver.

Membership
MGSCOMM is an active member of the following organizations: Association of Hispanic Advertising Agencies (AHAA), Public Relations Society of America (PRSA), Worldwide Partners, Latin Business Club of America.

References

External links 
 

Advertising agencies of the United States
Companies based in Miami